Major David Halstead (1861–1937) was a Conservative MP for Rossendale (UK Parliament constituency).

A long-time member of the Volunteers and Territorial Army (East Lancashire Regiment), Halstead saw action during the First World War. He was Mayor of Mayor of Haslingden in 1917, 1918, and 1919, and was a local antiquarian and historian.

He won Rossendale in 1922, but stood down in 1923.

See also

Sources
 
Whitaker's Almanack 1923 edition

Conservative Party (UK) MPs for English constituencies
1861 births
1937 deaths
British Army personnel of World War I
British antiquarians
Fellows of the Society of Antiquaries of London
English justices of the peace
Deputy Lieutenants